Sir Willie Reardon Smith, 2nd Baronet (26 May 1887 – 24 November 1950) was a British shipowner.

Reardon Smith was the son of Sir William Reardon Smith, 1st Baronet, and his wife Ellen Hamlyn. He followed his father as owner of the South Wales shipping company Reardon Smith Line. He was director of many shipping companies as well as director of The London Assurance Company. He served as High Sheriff of Glamorgan, and was a trustee of the National Museum of Wales.

Footnotes

1887 births
1950 deaths
High Sheriffs of Glamorgan
Baronets in the Baronetage of the United Kingdom
British businesspeople in shipping